Rock Creek Park is an unincorporated community and a census-designated place (CDP) located in and governed by El Paso County, Colorado, United States. The CDP is a part of the Colorado Springs, CO Metropolitan Statistical Area. The population of the Rock Creek Park CDP was 58 at the United States Census 2010. The Colorado Springs post office (Zip Code 80926) serves the area.

Geography
Rock Creek Park is located on Colorado State Highway 115 south of Cheyenne Mountain State Park.

Demographics

Attractions
May Natural History Museum
The May Museum of Space Exploration

See also

Outline of Colorado
Index of Colorado-related articles
State of Colorado
Colorado cities and towns
Colorado census designated places
Colorado counties
El Paso County, Colorado
Colorado metropolitan areas
Front Range Urban Corridor
South Central Colorado Urban Area
Colorado Springs, CO Metropolitan Statistical Area

References

External links

El Paso County website

Census-designated places in El Paso County, Colorado
Census-designated places in Colorado